Tween is the fifth studio album by indie band Wye Oak. It was released digitally on June 9, 2016 by Merge Records in the United States. The physical album was officially released on August 5, 2016.

Tween is unique in that all the songs were "written, scrapped, and re-purposed" by Wye Oak in between the years 2011 and 2014. Therefore, the tracks for the album are all remnants from their past albums Civilian and Shriek.

Track listing

Music videos
On the day of the album's release, Wye Oak debuted the music video for "Watching the Waiting". The video was directed by Michael Patrick O’Leary and Ashley North Compton, and features Wasner and Stack wearing mirrors and masks, alongside various backgrounds of deserts, forest, and water.

Personnel
Credits adapted from Tidal.

 Jenn Wasner – vocals, guitar, bass, keyboards, programming, production
 Andy Stack - drums, bass, guitar, keyboards, saxophone, programming, vocals, production
 Chris Freeland – engineering
 Hugo Nicolson – mixing
 Jeff Lipton – mastering
 Maria Rice – mastering assistance
 Ashley North Compton – artwork

References

2016 albums
Wye Oak albums
City Slang albums
Merge Records albums